President most commonly refers to:

President (corporate title)
President (education), a leader of a college or university
President (government title)

President may also refer to:

Automobiles
 Nissan President, a 1966–2010 Japanese full-size sedan
 Studebaker President, a 1926–1942 American full-size sedan
 VinFast President, a 2020–present Vietnamese mid-size SUV

Film and television
Præsidenten, a 1919 Danish silent film directed by Carl Theodor Dreyer
The President (1928 film), a German silent drama
President (1937 film), an Indian film
The President (1961 film)
The Presidents (film), a 2005 documentary
The President (2014 film)
The President (South Korean TV series), a 2010 South Korean television series
The President (Palestinian TV series), a 2013 Palestinian reality television show
The President Show, a 2017 Comedy Central political satirical parody sitcom

Music
The Presidents (American soul band)
The Presidents of the United States of America (band) or the Presidents, an American alternative rock group
"The President", a song by Snow Patrol from the 2011 album Fallen Empires
"The Presidents", a song by Jonathan Coulton
"The Presidents", a song on Animaniacs
The President, a band led by Wayne Horvitz

Places
The President (mountain), a mountain in British Columbia, Canada
President Township, Venango County, Pennsylvania, USA
an earlier name for the Sipapu Bridge

Ships
 President (1924 steamboat), an American river excursion steamboat
 President (narrowboat), a preserved English, steam-powered narrowboat
 HMS President (1650), a 42-gun fourth rate
 HMS President (1829), a 52-gun fourth rate
 HMS President (1650), the home of the London Division of the Royal Naval Reserve
 HMS Gannet or HMS President, a Doterel-class screw sloop launched in 1878
 HMS Buzzard or HMS President, a Nymphe-class screw sloop launched in 1887
 HMS Saxifrage or HMS President, an Anchusa-class sloop launched in 1918
 SS President, a 19th-century transatlantic steamship
 USS President (1800) and later HMS President, a 44-gun frigate
 USS President (1812), a 12-gun American sloop
 French frigate Président and later HMS President, a 40-gun frigate
 President-class frigate, a class of frigates

Other uses
President (CSRT), head of a Combatant Status Review Tribunal in the U.S. military
President (LDS Church honorific), a title in The Church of Jesus Christ of Latter-day Saints
President (college), a head of house in a collegiate university
President (card game), a westernized version of an originally Japanese card game named daifugō or daihinmin
President (grape) or Gouais blanc, a French wine grape 
President (tree), a giant sequoia in California, U.S.
Président (brand), a brand of French cheese and butter
Président (typeface), a font designed by Adrian Frutiger
Sinclair President, an electronic calculator in the late 1970s
The President (Rick and Morty), a fictional character from Rick and Morty

People with the surname
Andre President (born 1971), American football player

See also
HMS President, a list of ships
Mr. President (disambiguation)
Präsident, an automobile manufactured by Nesselsdorfer Wagenbau
Precedent, a previous court ruling
Presidency, administrative and governmental entity that exists around an office of president of a state or nation
Presidential (disambiguation)
USS President, a list of ships
:Category:Presidents by country
:Category:Lists of presidents